Financial instruments are monetary contracts between parties. They can be created, traded, modified and settled. They can be cash (currency), evidence of an ownership interest in an entity or a contractual right to receive or deliver in the form of currency (forex); debt (bonds, loans); equity (shares); or  derivatives (options, futures, forwards).

International Accounting Standards IAS 32 and 39 define a financial instrument as "any contract that gives rise to a financial asset of one entity and a financial liability or equity instrument of another entity".

Financial instruments may be categorized by "asset class" depending on whether they are equity-based (reflecting ownership of the issuing entity) or debt-based (reflecting a loan the investor has made to the issuing entity). If the instrument is debt it can be further categorized into short-term (less than one year) or long-term. Foreign exchange instruments and transactions are neither debt- nor equity-based and belong in their own category.

Types
Financial instruments can be either cash instruments or derivative instruments:
 Cash instruments – instruments whose value is determined directly by the markets. They can be securities, which are readily transferable, and instruments such as loans and deposits, where both borrower and lender have to agree on a transfer.
 Derivative instruments – instruments which derive their value from the value and characteristics of one or more underlining entities such as an asset, index, or interest rate. They can be exchange-traded derivatives and over-the-counter (OTC) derivatives. Some of the more common derivatives include forwards, futures, options, swaps, and variations of these such as synthetic collateralized debt obligations and credit default swaps.

Some instruments defy categorization into the above matrix, for example repurchase agreements.

Measuring gain or loss
The gain or loss on a financial instrument is as follows:

See also
 Off-balance-sheet issues
 IFRS 9 – Accounting standard titled "Financial Instruments"

References

External links
 IFRS List – The online community about IFRS/IAS and Auditing
 Understanding Derivatives: Markets and Infrastructure Federal Reserve Bank of Chicago, Financial Markets Group

Financial markets
Asset
Derivatives (finance)